Sir Josiah Francis (28 March 1890 – 22 February 1964) was an Australian politician who served in the House of Representatives from 1922 to 1955. He was a minister in the Lyons and Menzies governments, serving as Minister in charge of War Service Homes (1932–34), Minister for the Army (1949–55), and Minister for the Navy (1949–51; 1954–55). He held his defence portfolios during Australia's involvement in the Korean War.

Early life

Francis was born on 28 March 1890 in Ipswich, Queensland. He was the son of Ada Florence (née Hooper) and Henry Alfred Francis. His grandfather Josiah Francis was a prominent businessman in Ipswich, serving as the town's mayor and representing the seat of Ipswich in the Queensland Legislative Assembly.

Francis was educated at Christian Brothers' College, Ipswich, before joining the Queensland Department of Justice as a clerk in 1908. He was commissioned as a second lieutenant in the Australian Imperial Force (AIF) in 1916. He served with the 15th Battalion in France from April 1917 and was wounded in the shoulder in March 1918, rejoining his unit in September after several months in hospital. He was promoted captain in November before being discharged in Australia in September 1919. Francis became prominent in the Returned Sailors' and Soldiers' Imperial League of Australia, serving as president of the Ipswich sub-branch and Moreton district division.

Political career
Francis was elected to the Australian House of Representatives from the Brisbane-area seat of Moreton at the 1922 election as a member of the Nationalist Party of Australia. He continued to hold the seat until his retirement in November 1955 as a member of the main centre-right party—Nationalist (1922-1931), UAP (1931-1945) and Liberal (1945-1955). In April 1927, he married Edna Clarke Cribb—they had no children.

He was Minister in charge of War Service Homes from 1932 to 1934. He had been a member of the Returned Sailors' and Soldiers' Imperial League of Australia since 1920 and supported returned servicemen's issues. In 1943, while in opposition, he moved an amendment to allow the payment of full pensions to returned servicemen who were suffering from tuberculosis regardless of whether or not it could be shown to be caused by war service. Unusually in Australia, his amendment was passed without dissent. With the election of the Menzies government at the December 1949 election, he was appointed Minister for the Army and Minister for the Navy. He held the army portfolio until his retirement and the navy portfolio until May 1951; he was also Minister for the Navy from July 1954 until his retirement.

Later life
In 1956, Francis was appointed Australian consul general to New York. He was knighted in 1957 and retired to Brisbane in 1961. In 1962 he represented Australia at Uganda's independence celebrations. He also chaired the fundraising appeal for the Anzac Memorial Chapel at the Royal Military College, Duntroon.

Personal life
In 1927, Francis married Edna Clarke Cribb, the daughter of state MP James Clarke Cribb. The couple had no children. He collapsed and died on 22 February 1964 while watching a regatta on the Brisbane River at Toowong. He was granted a state funeral which was held at the Albert Street Methodist Church and attended by former prime ministers Arthur Fadden and Frank Forde.

Notes

External links

Nationalist Party of Australia members of the Parliament of Australia
United Australia Party members of the Parliament of Australia
Liberal Party of Australia members of the Parliament of Australia
Members of the Australian House of Representatives for Moreton
Members of the Australian House of Representatives
Members of the Cabinet of Australia
Australian Knights Bachelor
1890 births
1964 deaths
20th-century Australian politicians
Consuls-General of Australia in New York
Australian military personnel of World War I